Ian Entwistle (born 19 November 1986) is a British mixed martial artist who formerly competed in the Bantamweight division of the Ultimate Fighting Championship.

Background
Born and raised in Accrington, Lancashire, Entwistle competed in football on various levels as a youngster. Before he began training in martial arts, he briefly owned and operated a nightclub in Accrington.

He is supporter of Accrington Stanley Football club.

Mixed martial arts career

Early career
After the culmination of his soccer career, Enwistle began training in mixed martial arts in 2008.  He made his debut as a professional in 2010, competing as a featherweight for various regional promotions across England, including a stint in Cage Warriors.  He was able to compile a record along the way of 8-1, and finished all of his opponents in the first round.  After his finish of Liam James in December 2013, Entwistle moved from England to Phuket, Thailand in an attempt to further his career and enhance his Muay Thai skills.  He signed with the UFC in May 2014.

Ultimate Fighting Championship
Entwistle made his promotional debut on 28 June 2014 as he faced Dan Hooker at UFC Fight Night 43.  After threatening Hooker with several submission attempts, Entwistle lost the fight via TKO in the first round.

Entwistle faced Anthony Birchak in a bantamweight bout on 13 December 2014 at UFC on Fox 13.  Entwistle won the fight via submission in the first round.  He was also awarded a Performance of the Night bonus.

Entwistle was expected to face Marcus Brimage on 18 July 2015 at UFC Fight Night 72. However, Entwistle pulled out of the fight in late June for undisclosed reasons and was replaced by Jimmie Rivera.

Entwistle next faced Alejandro Pérez on 10 April 2016 at UFC Fight Night 86. He lost the fight via TKO in the first round.

Entwistle was scheduled to face Rob Font on 8 October 2016 at UFC 204. However on the day prior to the event, Entwistle fell ill during the weight cutting process and the bout was scrapped.

Entwistle was expected to face Brett Johns on 18 March 2017 at UFC Fight Night 107. Entwistle missed weight at the weigh ins coming in at 139lbs, 3lbs over the bantamweight limit of 136lbs. He forfeited 20% of his fight purse to his opponent. The following day, Entwistle's medical clearance was revoked following a trip to the hospital and the bout was canceled. Subsequently he was released from the UFC and retired from the sport.

Return from retirement
Over four years removed from his previous bout, Entwistle returned from retirement to face Dumar Roa at Brave CF 45 on November 19, 2020. He lost the fight via first-round technical knockout due to a knee injury.

Entwistle was next expected to face Daguir Imavov at Ares FC 2 on 11 December 2021.

Entwistle faced Arthur Demonceaux on May 20, 2022 at Ares FC 6. He lost by the way of TKO stoppage in the first round.

Mixed martial arts record

|-
|Loss
|align=center|9–5
|Arthur Demonceaux
|TKO (punches)
|Ares FC 6
|
|align=center|1
|align=center|1:21
|Paris, France
|
|-
| Loss
| align=center|9–4
| Dumar Roa
| TKO (injury)
| Brave CF 45
| 
| align=center|1
| align=center|2:47
| Riffa, Bahrain
| 
|-
| Loss
| align=center|9–3
| Alejandro Pérez
| TKO (punches)
| UFC Fight Night: Rothwell vs. dos Santos
| 
| align=center|1
| align=center|4:04
| Zagreb, Croatia
| 
|-
| Win
| align=center| 9–2
| Anthony Birchak
| Submission (heel hook)
| UFC on Fox: dos Santos vs. Miocic
| 
| align=center| 1
| align=center| 1:04
| Phoenix, Arizona, United States
| 
|-
| Loss
| align=center| 8–2
| Dan Hooker
| TKO (elbows)
| UFC Fight Night: Te-Huna vs. Marquardt 
| 
| align=center| 1
| align=center| 3:34
| Auckland, New Zealand
| 
|-
| Win
| align=center| 8–1
| Liam James
| Submission (heel hook)
| CWFC 62
| 
| align=center| 1
| align=center| 0:24
| Newcastle upon Tyne, England
| 
|-
| Win
| align=center| 7–1
| Will Cairns
| Submission (rear-naked choke) 
| SFF - Fight Ikon 10
| 
| align=center| 1
| align=center| 1:26
| Manchester, England
| 
|-
| Win
| align=center| 6–1
| Michael Bowman
| Submission (heel hook)
| OMMAC 13
| 
| align=center| 1
| align=center| 1:56
| Liverpool, England
| 
|-
| Win
| align=center| 5–1
| Andy Green
| Submission (rear-naked choke)
| CC-Cage Conflict 11
| 
| align=center| 1
| align=center| 0:31
| Liverpool, England
| 
|-
| Loss
| align=center| 4–1
|Brad Wheeler
|Submission (reverse triangle choke)
|CWFC 43 
|
| align=center| 1
| align=center| 3:22
| Kentish Town, England
| 
|-
| Win
| align=center| 4–0
| Brad Wheeler
| DQ (punches to back of head) 
| CWFC 41
| 
| align=center| 1
| align=center| 4:00
| Kentish Town, England
| 
|-
| Win
| align=center| 3–0
| Patrick Vickers
| Technical Submission (rear-naked choke)
| CWFC 40
| 
| align=center| 1
| align=center| 0:20
| Kentish Town, England
| 
|-
| Win
| align=center| 2–0
| Sebastien Grandin
| Submission (triangle choke)
| KUMMA: Kings of the North
| 
| align=center| 1
| align=center| 1:37
| Manchester, England
| 
|-
| Win
| align=center| 1–0
| Marius Buzinskas
| Submission (rear-naked choke)
| Cage Conflict 6
| 
| align=center| 1
| align=center| 0:56
| Accrington, England
|

See also
 List of current UFC fighters
 List of male mixed martial artists

References

External links

English male mixed martial artists
Bantamweight mixed martial artists
Mixed martial artists utilizing karate
Mixed martial artists utilizing Muay Thai
Mixed martial artists utilizing Brazilian jiu-jitsu
Living people
People from Accrington
English male karateka
English Muay Thai practitioners
English practitioners of Brazilian jiu-jitsu
1989 births
Sportspeople from Lancashire
Ultimate Fighting Championship male fighters